Farnsworth was a former town in Cass Township, Sullivan County, in the U.S. state of Indiana.

History
Extensive strip mining in the area caused the town of Farnsworth to become extinct.

A post office was established at Farnsworth in 1886, and remained in operation until it was discontinued in 1913.

Geography

References

Ghost towns in Indiana
Terre Haute metropolitan area